Alba Planas Menchén (Madrid, September 10, 2000) is a Spanish actress who became known in 2018 for her role as Eva Vázquez Villanueva in the series Skam España. Previously, in 2017, she appeared in the television series Centro médico.

Biography

First years 
Alba began taking acting classes at the age of 7, training in different performing arts schools. Her first steps into the world of acting were small roles in theater and the film El árbol de la sangre, directed by Julio Medem, in which she co-starred with Úrsula Corberó and Álvaro Cervantes. Subsequently, she was selected among numerous teenagers to play the lead role of Eva in Skam España.

Career 
Alba plays Eva Vázquez Villanueva in Skam España, the central protagonist in the first season of the series, and she continues to star in subsequent seasons until the end of the series in 2020. While continuing with her role as Eva in Skam, she has starred in several short films. In 2020, she shot the feature film Por los pelos by Nacho G. Velilla and the series Umbra, filmed in Arnedo. In 2021, she joins the cast of the first original series of Starz's Spain Express, along with Maggie Civantos and Kiti Mánver. In May of the same year, she joins the cast of Prime Video and Mediaset España Días mejores' series, where she plays Graci.

Filmography

Television

Cinema

Short films

References 

Spanish television actresses
Spanish film actresses
Living people
2000 births